Cougle is a surname. Notable people with the surname include:

Barry Cougle (born 1938), Australian rules footballer
Jesse Cougle (born 1975), American psychologist and professor